Anibal Mistorni, using the brand name AM Guitars, is a custom guitar maker (luthier) who uses found and salvaged materials including industrial scrap. He was born in Buenos Aires, Argentina and came to the U.S. in 1972 with the Portuguese woman, Palmira, who later became his wife. Trained as a carpenter, he settled in Yonkers, New York and did home renovations. He worked on projects for fellow Argentine Rudy Pensa, who owns Rudy's Music in Manhattan, New York, and on a trip to Rome decided he could build guitars similar to a sought after type. From wood he ventured into using scrap metal and industrial parts. He also works in fine wood from salvaged trees, makes metal sculptures and restores clocks.

References

Year of birth missing (living people)
Living people
People from Buenos Aires
Argentine emigrants to the United States
American luthiers